Towle Marine Aircraft Engineering Company  was an American aircraft manufacturer of light amphibious aircraft.

The short lived Towle Marine Aircraft Engineering Company, and its successor Towle Aircraft Company were founded by former Stout Metal Airplane Division of the Ford Motor Company engineer Thomas Towle initially to build a custom round-the world amphibious aircraft, and follow-on aircraft based on the design.

In a 1930 patent, Towle listed the Towle Aircraft Company as part of the Michigan Amphibian Airplane Corporation.

At the height of the depression, financing was difficult. Towle's TA-3 used diesel engines on loan from Packard, and was funded by Dr. Adams, a "painless dentist" of the Detroit region.

Aircraft

References

Defunct aircraft manufacturers of the United States